Milica Branković (d. 1464) was a Serbian princess and the first wife of Leonardo III Tocco, whom she married on 1 May 1463. She was a daughter of despot Lazar Branković of Serbia and Helena Palaiologina. Milica died in childbirth in 1464, while giving birth to Carlo III Tocco. Carlo III Tocco succeeded his father as titular ruler of Epirus (Arta) and Zakynthos. Her siblings were Maria, wife of King Stephen Tomašević of Bosnia and Jerina, wife of Gjon Kastrioti II.

Ancestry

References

Sources

 
 
 

Deaths in childbirth
1464 deaths
15th-century Serbian royalty
Milica
Tocco family
Medieval Serbian princesses
People of the Serbian Despotate
Consorts of Epirus
Medieval Serbian people of Greek descent